My Brother, My Brother and Me (often abbreviated as MBMBaM, pronounced ) is a weekly comedy advice podcast distributed by the Maximum Fun network and hosted by brothers Justin, Travis, and Griffin McElroy. Regular episodes of the podcast feature the brothers comedically providing answers to questions either submitted by listeners or found online.

The show was independently produced and released by the McElroy brothers from April 2010 until joining the Maximum Fun network of podcasts in January 2011. In 2010, the show was consistently listed among the top 10 comedy podcasts on iTunes. Writing for The A.V. Club, critics David Anthony and Colin Griffith both counted MBMBaM as one of their top 10 podcasts of 2012. A TV series based on the podcast premiered on Seeso in February 2017 and is currently hosted on VRV.

Format
MBMBAM takes the format of an advice show, where the McElroy brothers answer questions with a combination of silly and practical suggestions in the form of a rapid-fire comedy discussion. Early episodes used questions from various online sources, primarily Yahoo! Answers, as the podcast did not yet have an established audience to rely on for content. As the show gained popularity, the McElroy brothers were able to alternate between questions from listeners and questions from the Yahoo! Answers service. Each episode ended with Griffin reading a "Final Yahoo," which was left unanswered.

On May 4, 2021, the Yahoo! Answers service was shut down. This part of the show was replaced with content from other knowledge-exchange websites such as Quora and wikiHow, in a segment later named "Wizard of the Cloud" or "Wisdom of the Cloud."  The "Final Yahoo" at the end of each episode has been replaced with a variety of different sign-offs.

For the first 37 episodes, the show's theme song was "Take a Chance on Me" by ABBA, while "Root to This" by Fear of Pop and later "Play Your Part (Pt. 2)" by Girl Talk were used as closing themes. "(It's a) Departure" by John Roderick & The Long Winters (from the album Putting the Days to Bed) served as the theme song for My Brother, My Brother and Me from the January 17, 2011, episode "The Brain Wife" (the show's first with the Maximum Fun network) to the January 4, 2021, episode "The Naming of 2021." 

Due to Roderick's conduct surrounding the controversy over the musician's Twitter posting history, the show's official Twitter account announced that "(It's a) Departure" would no longer be used by the podcast as of January 3, 2021. From episodes 542 to 551, the show used the theme song from Rugrats, featuring lyrics sung by Griffin, as a placeholder for both the opening and ending theme. This was replaced in episode 552 with "My Life Is Better with You", which was written and performed by Australian artist Montaigne for the show.

Recurring segments
In addition to the usual format of responding to questions sent in by listeners, the podcast also frequently includes recurring segments. Most live shows include at least one of these segments, such as Munch Squad or Haunted Doll Watch. Segments include:
 "The Money Zone": A segment which occurs each episode, normally around the midpoint, including advertisements from corporate sponsors read by the hosts on air. Additionally, they would read paid messages from listeners, called "Jumbotrons," before discontinuing them for both MBMBaM and their Dungeons & Dragons podcast, "The Adventure Zone," in episode 436. 
 "Minion Quotes": A segment in live shows wherein Justin reads quotes which he finds in image macros on Facebook. Griffin and Travis attempt to guess which cartoon character is featured along with the quote. If Griffin or Travis guesses correctly, Justin must post the image on his Facebook page without comment, and cannot reply to the responses to the post. This has caused no small amount of distress to Justin.
 "Munch Squad": A "podcast within a podcast" in which Justin reads press releases from fast food companies. The segment is typically introduced by Justin interrupting the podcast after a Money Zone segment, singing a parody of the chorus of the Twisted Sister song, "I Wanna Rock".
 "Haunted Doll Watch": A segment which features Justin reading and critiquing eBay listings of apparently cursed, possessed, or haunted dolls.
 "Sad Libs": A segment in which Travis creates tragic stories with blank spaces and completes them with nonsensical or uncomfortable words, resembling Mad Libs. Performed largely at live shows, the segment is ridiculed and despised by Justin and Griffin.
 "That's a Christmas to Me": A segment in which Justin reads plot summaries of three Christmas movies, two of which are real and one of which is fake. Griffin and Travis must guess which description is fake.
"Riddle Me Piss": A segment in which Travis reads confusing and often nonsensical "riddles" from Riddles.com. While introducing the segment and reading the riddle, Travis will often adopt an exaggerated, high-pitched voice. Justin and Griffin tend to try to apply logic to otherwise illogical riddles, leaving both brothers exasperated and upset.
"Celebrity Wines, Why Not?": A game show-style segment in which Justin provides the name of a wine made by a celebrity, and Travis and Griffin attempt to guess the celebrity that makes the wine. The segment is typically introduced via singing.
"Reach for the Stars": A segment in which Travis reads Amazon reviews, along with their respective rating. Justin and Griffin's roles are to guess what products the reviews are for.
"Play Along At Home": A game show-style segment in which Travis asks Justin and Griffin trivia questions, while inviting the audience to "play along at home," in the style of a children’s television host. The questions cover a wide range of topics, but often end with an anecdotal question that Justin and Griffin would have no way of knowing. Travis started this segment shortly after having his second baby, and his brothers make it clear how much they dislike it.
"Under the Table and Phishing": A game show-style segment in which Travis reads lyrics from either Phish or Dave Matthews Band. Griffin and Justin then attempt to guess which band the lyrics are from. Travis, doing an impersonation of Dave Matthews, makes "guest appearances" as the co-host of this segment.
"Work of Fart": A game show-style segment with a format similar to that of Jeopardy. Travis provides Justin and Griffin with a statement that combines a description of a classic piece of film, literature or other work of art, with a reference to bathroom humour. Justin and Griffin then try to guess what pun Travis created to mashup the title of the work in question with the bathroom humor word.
"Naming of the Year": A segment done at the beginning of each year where the brothers decide on a theme for the year (which vaguely rhymes with the year in question) which can act as a guiding principle for them and their listeners. Examples include "Twenty-Fix-Teen: Building Bridges" (2016) and "Frankenstein-Teen: Become the Monster" (2019).
"Wizard of the Cloud": A segment intended to replace Yahoo Answers following the website's shutdown in May 2021. Within, Griffin presents a wikiHow article which gives questionable advice on obscure topics.  Examples include "How to Mosh in a Mosh Pit", "How to Choose a Nickname For Your Car", and "How to Make It Look Like You Have Snow Powers".

Special episodes
Episodes of the show are occasionally performed and recorded in front of live audiences at venues in cities such as Los Angeles, New York City and Huntington; the format remains the same, including recurring segments such as Munch Squad, with the addition of a section where the brothers take questions from the audience. A special episode called "The Adventure Zone" was released on August 18, 2014, shortly after Justin and his wife Sydnee had a baby. It featured the brothers playing a game of Dungeons & Dragons with their father, Clint McElroy. The Adventure Zone was later spun off into its own podcast on the Maximum Fun network.

Philanthropy
Over its history, the show has engaged its fans to support charities in their hometown of Huntington, West Virginia. In 2014, the show spawned a campaign among fans called MBMBaM Angels, in which fans of the show would buy requested items from the "Empty Stockings" list published by Huntington's Herald-Dispatch. In 2020, the campaign raised over $23,000. 

In 2020, the brothers sold a sign from their short-lived television show online, raising $3,200 for the local Habitat for Humanity branch.

The brothers also host a live show every year for "Candlenights," a fictional holiday. The show, normally held in-person in Huntington, is also a major fundraiser. Past shows have supported Recovery Point, a local recovery center for those recovering from addiction, and Big Brothers Big Sisters of South Central West Virginia. The 2019 show at the Keith-Albee Theatre in Huntington raised $46,000 for Harmony House, a local organization helping the homeless in Cabell County, West Virginia. Due to the COVID-19 pandemic, the 2020 Candlenights show was moved from in-person to an online on-demand event. While the executive director of Harmony House expected the online show to raise half of the 2019 total, the show raised over $200,000 for the organization. Additionally, Justin McElroy's wife and mother-in-law directly volunteer with the organization.

Guests
The show occasionally features guest experts (referred to as "guestsperts") who help the McElroy brothers answer questions. Notable past guests include:

Jimmy Buffett, musician
 Jessica Alyssa Cerro, aka Montaigne, musician, Eurovision contestant, singer/writer of current podcast theme “My Life Is Better With You”. 
Bill Corbett, television and theatre writer, producer and performer
Laura Kate Dale, author and video game journalist
Felicia Day, actress and writer
Jesse Eisenberg, actor and writer
Cameron Esposito, stand-up comedian and podcast host
Elsie Fisher, actress
Ron Funches, comedian, actor and writer
 Chris Gethard, actor, author, and talk show host
Elizabeth Gilbert, author
John Green and Hank Green, vlogger, podcaster, and author
Marilu Henner, actress, producer, radio host, and author
John Hodgman, actor, author, and podcast host
Christian Jacobs, aka MC Bat Commander, musician, actor and producer
Bridget Lancaster, producer and host of America's Test Kitchen
Lin-Manuel Miranda, actor, award-winning composer, playwright, and rapper
Randall Munroe, author and webcomic artist
Griffin Newman, actor and comedian
Jonah Ray, actor, comedian, and podcast host
John Roderick, musician and podcast host, singer/writer of current podcast theme of old podcast theme "(It's A) Departure"
Patrick Rothfuss, fantasy author
Dan Savage, advice columnist, podcast host, and author
Jake Hurwitz and Amir Blumenfeld, actors, comedians and podcast hosts
Ify Nwadiwe, actor, writer, and comedian
Episode 400 featured a number of celebrity guests, including Miranda, Buffet, Henner, Ethan Suplee, Corey Cott, Steve Kroft, Brenda Vaccaro, and Al Roker. That episode also featured Matt Doyle as part of a running joke about Justin's inability to recognize the actor, which was resurrected when he appeared onstage at the beginning of a live show in Brooklyn in 2019.

TV show
A television series based on the podcast was ordered for NBC's Seeso video streaming platform. Filming took place for three weeks during September 2016 in the McElroys' hometown of Huntington, West Virginia, with most of the episodes featuring scenes with their father Clint McElroy and mayor Stephen T. Williams. "(It's a) Departure" by John Roderick and the Long Winters was retained as the theme song for the television series. The show ran for six episodes, all of which were released via Seeso on February 23, 2017.

In June 2017, the series was sold to Otter Media for its streaming service VRV, alongside other former Seeso programs including HarmonQuest.

The metal sign with the show's logo used in the primary set was auctioned off for charity in July 2020.

References

Primary

Secondary

External links
 at MaximumFun.org
 by RSS feed
 at VRV

Advice podcasts
Comedy and humor podcasts
Maximum Fun
2010 podcast debuts
Audio podcasts